Optimist World Championship are annual World Championship sailing regattas in the Optimist class organised by the International Optimist Dinghy Association.

Editions

Medalists

References

Optimist competitions
Recurring sporting events established in 1962
World championships in sailing